Zéphirin Gnahoua Zoko (born 13 September 1977) is an Ivorian former professional footballer who played as a forward.

Zoko was a member of the Ivory Coast squad for the 2000 and 2002 Africa Cup of Nations.

External links

1977 births
Living people
Association football forwards
Ivorian footballers
Ivory Coast international footballers
2000 African Cup of Nations players
2002 African Cup of Nations players
Ivorian expatriate footballers
ASEC Mimosas players
Stade d'Abidjan players
Paris FC players
Olympique Alès players
AS Cannes players
K.V. Oostende players
K.A.A. Gent players
Nîmes Olympique players
Luzenac AP players